Goeppertia ecuadoriana (syn. Calathea ecuadoriana) is a species of flowering plant in the Marantaceae family. It is endemic to Ecuador. Its natural habitats are subtropical or tropical moist lowland forests and subtropical or tropical moist montane forests.

References

ecuadoriana
Flora of Ecuador
Near threatened plants
Taxonomy articles created by Polbot
Taxobox binomials not recognized by IUCN